Ophiopsila is a genus of brittle star belonging to the family Ophiocomidae. Many species are bioluminescent.

List of species 
 Ophiopsila abscissa Liao, 1982
 Ophiopsila annulosa (M. Sars, 1859)
 Ophiopsila aranea Forbes, 1843
 Ophiopsila bispinosa A.M. Clark, 1974
 Ophiopsila brevisquama Koehler, 1930
 Ophiopsila californica A.H. Clark, 1921
 Ophiopsila caribea (Ljungman, 1872)
 Ophiopsila dilatata Koehler, 1930
 Ophiopsila fulva Lyman, 1878
 Ophiopsila glabra Koehler, 1930
 Ophiopsila guineensis Koehler, 1914
 Ophiopsila hartmeyeri Koehler, 1913
 Ophiopsila maculata (Verrill, 1899)
 Ophiopsila multipapillata Guille & Jangoux, 1978
 Ophiopsila multispina Koehler, 1930
 Ophiopsila novaezealandiae Baker, 1974
 Ophiopsila pantherina Koehler, 1898
 Ophiopsila paucispina Koehler, 1907
 Ophiopsila picturata Koehler, 1930
 Ophiopsila platispina Koehler, 1914
 Ophiopsila polyacantha H.L. Clark, 1915
 Ophiopsila polysticta H.L. Clark, 1915
 Ophiopsila riisei Lütken, 1859
 Ophiopsila seminuda A.M. Clark, 1952
 Ophiopsila squamifera Murakami, 1963
 Ophiopsila timida Koehler, 1930
 Ophiopsila vittata H.L. Clark, 1918

References
 Ophiuroidea Data Base

 
Ophiocomidae
Ophiuroidea genera